Element K may refer to:
 The chemical element Potassium given symbol K (Latin kalium)
 An educational software package owned by Skillsoft